Missing People (previously known as National Missing Persons Helpline) is a national organisation in the United Kingdom that offers assistance to people who run away and/or go missing and their families. It is a registered charity under English law.

History

Early years (1986–89)

Following the high-profile disappearance of estate agent Suzy Lamplugh from Fulham in July 1986, two sisters, Janet Newman and Mary Asprey, co-founded the National Missing Persons Helpline. With no news of Lamplugh's whereabouts media attention moved to the apparent lack of support for missing persons' families, such as Paul and Diane Lamplugh. The sisters established the Trust's initial work on missing people.

Helpline (1990–92)

From a bedroom at the sisters' home in East Sheen, south west London, a start-up service was formed in early 1990. The service used the Freefone number 0500 700 700 ( and this continued in operation until June 2017 when Ofcom closed down all remaining 0500 numbers). Meanwhile, the Suzy Lamplugh Trust moved towards issues surrounding personal safety and safety in the workplace. Initially Mary and Janet and a small team of volunteers simply comforted callers to the helpline. However, they soon realised families wanted more than just telephone support. In 1992, having re-mortgaged their houses, Mary and Janet applied to register National Missing Persons Helpline (NMPH) as a charity.

Expansion (1993)

By the time it became a registered charity in April 1993, NMPH needed new offices to provide a complete range of services for relatives, enabling the charity to both find and support. This expansion was greatly helped by founders of the Big Issue, who secured premises in Mortlake. Missing People is still based there today. ITN's Sir Trevor McDonald – later to become a Vice Patron, instigated invaluable publicity. Where funding allowed, new staff and volunteers joined and the information taken from each caller regarding a disappearance became more detailed and more accurate. A department offering Publicity was born. The success of the charity was cemented in its first year by an office visit from Diana, Princess of Wales in October.

Getting the message home (1994)

In February 1994 the resources of NMPH were stretched to the limit by the horrific discoveries at 25 Cromwell Street, Gloucester. Calls to the helpline from relatives of missing people trebled and extra volunteers had to be brought in to answer the phones. New callers reported relatives missing for the first time, even though some had vanished ten years ago or even more. Distressed families already in touch with the helpline called again, in case their missing relative might figure in the investigation. The police directed anxious families to NMPH for comfort and support. Gloucestershire Police called too, seeking help on identifying the bodies found at Cromwell Street and elsewhere. Their initial interest was in women reported missing from Worcestershire and Gloucestershire in the 1970s and 1980s. Some 390 names were supplied including Alison Chambers and Carol Cooper who were later identified as victims. At the same time, details mentioned by Frederick West were passed to NMPH for checking against our database. One result of this was the identification of Juanita Mott another of the victims discovered at Cromwell Street. A positive side effect of the charities role in the investigation was the reunion of 110 non-victim families in less than two months. On 27 June 1994 the charity took over the Message Home Helpline from the Mothers' Union, allowing adult missing people to pass a message home. In response to NMPH's growing achievements the charity was honoured that The Duchess of Gloucester GCVO accepted the role of Patron. The Duchess continues to attend performances on our behalf and raise morale of staff and volunteers with regular visits.

Recognition (1996–1998)

In 1996 Asprey and Newman were honoured for their services to charity with OBEs. In 1998 both were honoured with the "UK Women of Europe Award" and in the same year given the European Women of Achievement Humanitarianism Award and The Rotary Foundation's prestigious Paul Harris Fellowships.

Lost from View (2002)

The charity celebrated its 10th birthday. Jointly with the University of York, NMPH produced Lost from View in February 2002. Funded by the Nuffield Foundation, for the first time research used the charity's unique database of all types of missing people to provide information and trends about the missing phenomenon.

Pioneering work (2003–2004)

Further accolades followed in 2003 when Mary and Janet were invited by The Queen and the Duke of Edinburgh to a reception at Buckingham Palace to mark the contribution of Pioneers to the life of the Nation. 2003 also saw the national roll out of the 'Missing from Care' project for local authorities 'looked after children' in September. This work for young people continued in May 2004 when NMPH launched the Runaway Helpline, as a direct response to a recommendation in the 2002 report by The Social Exclusion Task Force.

Financial problems (2005–2006)

The media reported that after years of inadequate funding and little input from the private sector, NMPH was to close. Under the direction of the co-founders, Sir Norman Wakefield was appointed as advisor and formed a consortium of charitable organisations that offered financial support. After an outpouring of public support the Home Office too announced emergency funding for the charity. In September 2005, Paul Tuohy joined the charity as their first chief executive. The charity reformed its board of trustees and started a considerable process of strategic planning.

Relaunch (2007–2008)

In May 2007 – 2008 the charity relaunched as "Missing People". This reflected the considerable strategic developments that had been made and the fact that the charity now provided a range of services rather than a single helpline. Also in May, less than one week after her disappearance, missing three-year-old Madeleine McCann had become headline news around the globe. On International Missing Children's Day (26 May) an appeal by the charity was projected onto Marble Arch to highlight Madeleine's disappearance and the plight of missing children across the UK. In August Missing People launched the first comprehensive online "missing map" in the UK and Missing People TV' – the first online channel featuring appeals of missing people. In October the charity along with other NGOs from the English Coalition for Runaway Children asked the government to ‘stop missing the missing issue’. This led to the government developing a strategy on the protection of young runaways for the first time ever. In 2007 the charity also teamed up with the police to hold their first joint conference on "missing". Delegates came from across the globe came to Blackpool to debate and learn about the latest developments. In November 2007 Missing People won two awards for its website – which received more than 40 million hits in its first year. In December the BBC launched ‘Reunited’ – a season of hard hitting programmes about family members seeking to contact missing relatives and the complex reasons people run away.

Missing people march (2008)

In March 2008 hundreds of families of the missing joined together to march through London to highlight the impact of someone going missing from their family. The march was organised and led by Nicki Durbin, mother of missing Luke Durbin, who went missing after a night out in Ipswich, Suffolk in 2006; Val Nettles, mother of missing Damien Nettles, who was last seen in Cowes on the Isle of Wight in 1996 and Jill Blonsky. Radiohead supported the charity with the donation of an exclusive one-off remix tape. April saw the first of the award-winning series Missing Live on BBC One. Successes included finding more than 100 people over the four-week show. Missing People's financial position was strengthened by a landmark decision by the Department for Children, Schools and Families (DCSF) to grant the charity £310,000 in June 2008  and by the appointment of five new trustees, which led to a shortlisting at the Third Sector Awards 2009 for most improved Trustee Board. In October 2009 Missing People and Iceland supermarket teamed up to launch milk carton appeals for the missing, following on from the success of a previous initiative with Iceland which had helped to find more than 17 people across millions of cartons. The first new appeal was for Andrew Gosden, a 14-year-old boy last seen at King's Cross Station. In December 2009 Missing People launched the first report into the experiences of, and impacts on, the families of missing people called ‘Living in Limbo’. Also in December Missing People teamed up with 95.8 Capital FM to launch the Runaway Helpline text service, the first free helpline text service for young people, which was funded by Vodafone Foundation.

116xxx telephone number issued (2009)

In 2009, Ofcom introduced the first harmonised European numbers for harmonised services of social value, allocating 116 000 to the Missing People service. This number is free to call from mobiles and landlines.

0500 telephone number withdrawn (2017)
The existing 0500 700 700 telephone number continued to operate in parallel with the new 116 000 number for many years. Finally, in June 2017, Ofcom withdrew all 0500 numbers, and the 0500 line was no more. The 0500 number had been free to call from landlines but had cost up to 40p per minute to call from a mobile telephone.

Working with the police

Missing People works in partnership with police forces  and other agencies across the UK to help find missing children and adults and support their family or carer. Missing people offers publicity opportunities to police forces and at the request of the police Missing People can send a missing person a text message informing them about the charity and the support we can offer. These services are available at no direct cost to police forces, the missing person or their family.

Events

International Missing Children's Day is one day a year when people remember missing children and their families. The charity mark this day by holding their Big Tweet for Missing Children. For 24 hours the charity harnesses the power of Twitter to publicise missing children appeals. The charity tweets a different missing child appeal every 30 minutes for 24 hours and are supported in this by a range of celebrities and organisations. In 2013 The Big Tweet for Missing Children was sponsored by The Sun newspaper and celebrities including Simon Cowell and Stephen Fry endorsed the campaign making it the most successful Big Tweet in the charity's history. Missing People's Twitter handle is @MissingPeople.

Miles for Missing People is an annual running event held by the charity Missing People. The popular event, includes a 10K, a 3K and a kids run as well as entertainment and family activities, is held on or around 25 May to mark International Missing Children's Day. Hundreds of supporters and families of missing people join together to participate in the races and fundraise for the charity raising thousands of pounds for the charity's work.

The Missing People Cycle Challenge is another of Missing People's popular challenge events which takes place in June or July each year and involves groups of cyclists cycling from Edinburgh to London over a five-day period. The tough challenge is an incredibly rewarding and moving experience for the participants as they support each other through the intense five-day experience in order to raise funds to help support the families of Missing People.

The Missing People Choir was founded by the charity in 2014.

References

External links

Information on fundraising events

1993 establishments in the United Kingdom
Missing People
Charities based in London
East Sheen
Missing People (United Kingdom)
Organisations based in the London Borough of Richmond upon Thames
Organizations established in 1993